Paul Kerlin (born 18 October 1953) is a Scottish former professional footballer. He played in the Netherlands for De Graafschap and Go Ahead Eagles.

References

1953 births
Living people
Scottish footballers
De Graafschap players
Go Ahead Eagles players
Eerste Divisie players
Eredivisie players
Association football midfielders
Scottish expatriate footballers
Scottish expatriate sportspeople in the Netherlands
Expatriate footballers in the Netherlands